Magic Silver ("Christmas Night on Blue Mountain") is a Norwegian Christmas film from 2009 directed by Katarina Launing and Roar Uthaug.

The film is based on the television series Jul i Blåfjell ("Christmas on Blue Mountain") and Jul på Månetoppen] ("Christmas on Moon Peak"), but the film is set 100 years before this and portrays the first dramatic encounter between the red gnomes and the blue gnomes, as well as the pursuit of the magical blue silver. The film was followed by a sequel, Magic Silver II ("Blue Mountain II: Search for the Magic Horn"), in 2011.

The film premiered on November 13, 2009, and was released on DVD on November 17, 2010. It was viewed in the theaters by nearly 370,000 people.

The film was nominated for the Amanda Award in the category children's and youth film in 2010.

Cast
 Simen Bakken: Erke
 Sigve Bøe: Rimspå
 Nikoline Ursin Erichsen: Tufsa
 Johan Tinus Lindgren: Dreng
 Lillian Lydersen: Blåværskona
 Jan Gunnar Røise: Halvor
 Finn Schau: Fjellkonge
 Ane Viola Semb: Fjellrose
 Martin Slaatto: Vom
 Knut Walle: Nissefar
 Hanne Kogh: Sonja

References

External links 
 

2009 films
Films based on television series
Films directed by Roar Uthaug
2000s Norwegian-language films
Norwegian children's films
Norwegian Christmas films